Tomi Peltonen (born January 22, 1987) is a Finnish professional ice hockey player. He is currently playing for LeKi of the Finnish Mestis.

Peltonen made his Liiga debut playing with Tappara during the 2007–08 Liiga season.

References

External links

1987 births
Living people
Tappara players
KooKoo players
Lempäälän Kisa players
Kiekko-Laser players
Finnish ice hockey forwards
Ice hockey people from Tampere